Medan is the capital city of North Sumatra province, Indonesia

Medan may also refer to:

People 
 Medan (son of Abraham), 3rd son of Abraham
 Yaaqov Medan (born 1950), Israeli rabbi
 Anton Medan (1957–2021), Indonesian criminal
 Saint Medan, early Christian saint in Britain

Others 
 Médan, Yvelines, France
 SS Ourang Medan, a wrecked merchant ship

Hebrew-language given names
Hebrew-language surnames